Anthene kalinzu is a butterfly in the family Lycaenidae. It is found in western Uganda and north-western Tanzania. The habitat consists of forests.

References

Butterflies described in 1950
Anthene
Butterflies of Africa